Mattia Frapporti (born 2 July 1994) is an Italian racing cyclist, who currently rides for UCI ProTeam . He rode at the 2014 UCI Road World Championships.

Major results

2012
 3rd Trofeo Comune di Vertova
 5th Trofeo Emilio Paganessi
 6th Trofeo Buffoni
2016
 4th Trofeo Edil C
 7th Overall Tour de Serbie
2017
 1st Stage 1 Tour du Jura
2019
 6th Overall Tour of China II

References

External links
 

1994 births
Living people
Italian male cyclists
Cyclists from the Province of Brescia